Thomas Smith (1773January 29, 1846) was a Federalist member of the United States House of Representatives who served Pennsylvania's 1st congressional district from 1815 to 1817.

A native of Pennsylvania, Smith lived in Tinicum Township in the state's Delaware County when, in 1806, he was elected to the Pennsylvania House of Representatives, serving through 1807. A Federalist Party candidate in the Election of 1814, he won the first district seat to represent Pennsylvania in the Fourteenth United States Congress from March 4, 1815, to March 3, 1817.

In 1815, the first year of his one-term Congressional service, Smith moved to Darby Township (later Darby Borough). Three decades later, at the time of his death, he was still in public service, as a justice of the peace in Darby.  Although the year of his birth has remained undocumented, his record as a state politician in the first decade of the 19th century indicates that he lived at least into his mid- to late sixties. The interment was in St. James's (Old Swedes) Cemetery in Paschall (now a part of Philadelphia).

Among his descendants was Aubrey Henry Smith (1814-1891), a lawyer, U.S. district attorney, and early officer of the Philadelphia, Wilmington, and Baltimore Railroad.

Sources

Congressional Biography
The Political Graveyard
 

Members of the Pennsylvania House of Representatives
Pennsylvania state court judges
People from Delaware County, Pennsylvania
1846 deaths
1773 births
Federalist Party members of the United States House of Representatives from Pennsylvania
Burials at Gloria Dei (Old Swedes') Church